Derek Dwayne Hood (born December 22, 1976) is an American former professional basketball player. He played college basketball for the Arkansas Razorbacks. In the NBA, Hood played for the Charlotte Hornets.

College career

Hood, a 6'8", 222 pound small forward born in Decatur, Illinois, attended the University of Arkansas.

Professional career

Hood played two games for the National Basketball Association's Charlotte Hornets during the 1999-2000 NBA season.

Hood also played in the CBA with the Quad City Thunder and Yakima Sun Kings, in Italy with Snaidero Udine, in the ABA with the Kansas City Knights, in the NBDL with the Mobile Revelers, and in France with ASVEL Villeurbanne. He was selected to the CBA All-Rookie Team in 2000.

After basketball
In 2015 Hood was inducted into the Arkansas Sports Hall of Honor.

Currently Hood is a math teacher at Liberty Junior High also he is the athletic director and he coaches 7th and 8th grade alternating between them each year

References

External links
NBA D-League profile @ NBA.com
Derek Hood player profile @ NBA.com

1976 births
Living people
African-American basketball players
American expatriate basketball people in France
American expatriate basketball people in Italy
American expatriate basketball people in Venezuela
American men's basketball players
Arkansas Razorbacks men's basketball players
ASVEL Basket players
Basketball players from Illinois
Charlotte Hornets players
McDonald's High School All-Americans
Mobile Revelers players
Parade High School All-Americans (boys' basketball)
Sportspeople from Decatur, Illinois
Small forwards
Undrafted National Basketball Association players
Yakama Sun Kings players
21st-century African-American sportspeople
20th-century African-American sportspeople